Mihail Kogălniceanu is a commune in Tulcea County, Northern Dobruja, Romania. It is composed of three villages: Lăstuni (formerly Hagilar), Mihail Kogălniceanu (formerly Enichioi) and Rândunica (formerly Kongaz or Congaz).

At the 2011 census, the population was 98.4% Romanian and 1.1% Roma. At the 1930 census, the ethnic composition was as follows. Congaz was 93.9% Bulgarian and 4.5% Romanian; Hagilar was 96.2% Bulgarian and 3.2% Romanian; Mihail Kogălniceanu was 67.8% Bulgarian and 31.2% Romanian.

The ethnic Bulgarian population was resettled to Bulgaria during the population exchange following the Treaty of Craiova. As a result of this population exchange, the commune gained a large Aromanian community that still exists today.

References
Notes

Sources

Communes in Tulcea County
Localities in Northern Dobruja
Aromanian settlements in Romania